Pied or piebald is an animal spotting pattern

Pied may also refer to:
 Pieing, throwing a pie at a person
 Multicolored, as in the Pied Piper
 Pied de roi, one of many units of measurement in France before the French Revolution